7 (pronounced as "seven") is the seventh studio album by Bosnian recording artist Maya Berović and her second collaborative effort with rappers Jala Brat and Buba Corelli, released on July 8, 2018. The record contains nine pop-folk tracks with elements of dancehall, reggaeton and trap music.

Following the release of the album, Berović embarked on a regional tour called Pravo vreme (Right Time) after her duet with Buba Corelli. The first show was held in the Belgrade Arena on November 2.

Track listing

Pravo Vreme Tour

Tour dates

Box office score data

Cancelled shows

Release history

References

External links
7 by Maya Berović at Discogs

2018 albums
Maya Berović albums